The 1973 European Rowing Championships were rowing championships held at the regatta course on the Krylatskoye Rowing Canal in Moscow, Soviet Union. The competition was the first use of the venue. There were seven competitions for men and five for women. World Rowing Championships were held, up until 1974, at four-year intervals, and the European Rowing Championships were open to nations outside of Europe and had become to be regarded as quasi-world championships. From 1974 the world championships changed to an annual schedule, and the European Rowing Championships were discontinued. It was only in 2006 that the International Rowing Federation (FISA) decided to re-establish the European Rowing Championships, with the 2007 event the first regatta after the hiatus.

Women competed in Moscow from 23 to 26 August. Their event overlapped with the 1973 Summer Universiade that was also held in the city. Twenty nations nominated women to the competition, but only 18 nations had their women compete with a total of 53 boats (W1x: 14 boats; W2x: 11 boats; W4x+: 10 boats; W4+: 10 boats; W8+: 8 boats). At the time, there was an expectation that rowing for women would be included in the 1976 Olympic programme, and it was expected that women would compete at the 1974 World Rowing Championships. For that reason, East Germany had decided to put forward younger rowers so that they would have become experienced by 1976. Women competed over a distance of 1000 meters.

Men competed from 29 August to 2 September, and 29 countries representing 4 continents nominated 109 boats. Men competed over a distance of 2000 metres.

Medal summary
Medallists at the 1973 European Rowing Championships were:

Women's events

Men's events

Medals table

References

European Rowing Championships
European Rowing Championships
Rowing
Rowing
Rowing
Sports competitions in Moscow